The Khersones or Chersones is a Russian three-mast tall ship, a full-rigged ship. It was built in 1989 in Gdańsk Shipyard, Poland, in a series of six sister ships (among which also the Mir), after the designs of Polish naval architect Zygmunt Choreń. The ship is named after the city of Chersonesus an ancient city and archaeological site near Sevastopol.

During 1991-2014 she walked under the Ukrainian flag. Today Khersones was a training ship for the Admiral Ushakov Maritime State University. She partakes in many windjammer regattas. In 1997, it became the first "Ukrainian" ship to sail around Cape Horn by only using her sails.

At the same time, it was rented to the tourism company Inmaris Maritime Service GmbH as a cruise ship. This agreement was terminated in 2006 as Inmaris accused the Ukrainian side of refusing to pay for repairs that Inmaris had ordered, and to avoid an arrest on the vessel, it was then moved permanently to the docks in the Port of Kerch.

After the Russian occupation of Crimea in 2014, the ship was seized by Russian authorities. A dispute over control of the ship began between the Federal Agency for Fishery of Russia and the Ministry of Transport, with the Ministry gaining the upper hand with its subsidiary FGUP Rosmorport. In 2015 the ship traveled to the Sevastopol Shipyard for repairs, and later made its home port in the city due to the construction of the Crimean Bridge near Kerch. Khersones took part in "SCF Black Sea Tall Ships Regatta – 2016".

See also
List of large sailing vessels
List of tall ships

References

External links
 ship's data (in German) with photos, Inmaris Maritime Service
 Kersones visit to Cape Town

Tall ships of Russia
Windjammers
Training ships
Three-masted ships
1989 ships
Individual sailing vessels
Ships built in Gdańsk
Ships of the Soviet Union
Poland–Soviet Union relations
Full-rigged ships

Ships of Russia